Totra is a locality situated in Gävle Municipality, Gävleborg County, Sweden, with 273 inhabitants in 2010.

References 

Populated places in Gävle Municipality
Gästrikland